Pian may refer to:
 Pian (disease), a tropical infection of the skin, bones and joints
 Pian-e Olya, a village in Khuzestan Province, Iran
 Pian-e Sofla, a village in Khuzestan Province, Iran
 Pian Rural District, in Khuzestan Province, Iran
 Pian Camuno, a commune in the province of Brescia, in Lombardy, Italy
 Pian di Scò, a commune in the province of Arezzo, in Tuscany, Italy
 Pian, Uganda, a county of Moroto District, in Uganda
 Rulan Chao Pian, ethnomusicologist and scholar of Chinese language.
 Pians also refers to seminarians and alumni of St. Pius X Seminary and Sancta Maria Mater et Regina Seminarium.